3D is a studio album by vocal trio The Three Degrees released in late 1979. The album, which was produced by Giorgio Moroder and Harold Faltermeyer, yielded two successful single releases, "Jump the Gun" and "My Simple Heart". "Without You" and "Starlight" were also released as singles, but failed to make any impact on the singles chart. In the US "Set Me Free" was released and was a hit in the clubs and US Disco Charts. The album peaked at #61 in the UK album charts.

The rights to the Ariola Records back catalogue are now held by Sony BMG Music Entertainment - the original 3D album in its entirety was finally released on compact disc in Japan in late 2008. The album was re-issued on CD in the UK in March 2011 by BBR Records with nine bonus tracks.

Track listing

Personnel
 Sheila Ferguson – vocals
 Valerie Holiday – vocals
 Helen Scott – vocals

Production
 Giorgio Moroder – co-producer
 Harold Faltermeyer – co-producer, arranger
 Keith Forsey – arranger
 Jürgen Koppers – engineer
 Recorded at Musicland Studios, Munich.

References

1979 albums
Disco albums by American artists
The Three Degrees albums
Albums produced by Giorgio Moroder
Ariola Records albums